Camille Le Menn (born 23 February 1934) is a French former professional racing cyclist. He rode in four editions of the Tour de France.

References

External links
 

1934 births
Living people
French male cyclists
Sportspeople from Brest, France
Cyclists from Brittany